The United Nations Office of Administration of Justice (OAJ), headed by an Executive Director appointed by the Secretary-General, is responsible for coordinating the functioning of the internal justice system of the United Nations. The first Executive Director of the Office of Administration of Justice was Mr. Andrei Terekhov who is now retired. The current Executive Director is Ms. Alayne Frankson-Wallace.  The OAJ became operational on 1 July 2009, replacing an old system that was in effect for 60 years. A hallmark of this new justice system is that it is independent.

The Office of Staff Legal Assistance and the Registries for the United Nations Dispute Tribunal and the United Nations Appeals Tribunal are part of the Office of Administration of Justice. With its headquarters in New York City, the Office of Administration of Justice also has a presence — through the UNDT registries and the branch offices of the Office of Staff Legal Assistance — in Geneva, Nairobi, Addis Ababa, and Beirut.

Official website of the United Nations Office of Administration of Justice

Organizations established by the United Nations